The Spike Video Game Awards (in short VGAs, known as the VGX for the final show) was an annual award show hosted by American television network Spike from 2003 to 2013 that recognized the best computer and video games of the year. Produced by GameTrailers TV's Geoff Keighley, the show featured preview trailers for upcoming games, live music performances and appearances by popular performers in music, movies, and television.

The VGAs was held at various locations in Los Angeles and Santa Monica, California as well as Las Vegas, Nevada. Spike's only Video Game Hall of Fame award, given to The Legend of Zelda, was awarded at the 2011 awards show.

On November 15, 2013, Spike announced a new format under the name VGX, calling it "The next generation of the VGAs". The last award show, carrying this name, aired on December 7. Changes from the previous format included "in-depth extended demos of the next generation of games and interactive one-on-one interviews and panels in an intimate studio setting."

On November 10, 2014, it was announced that Spike would drop their award show, ending their decade-long run. Geoff Keighley went on to create his own video game award show in the form of The Game Awards starting in that year, dropping the support from Spike.

VGX

2013 awards
The 2013 awards, the final awards show, was rebranded as VGX and held on December 7, 2013, and was hosted by Joel McHale. The show featured a different format from previous years. It featured extended demos of next-generation games, one-on-one interviews, and "a more intimate studio setting." Rather than airing live on Spike TV, the show was livestreamed online on Xbox One, Xbox 360, PlayStation 3, Twitch, Steam, iOS, and Android devices, as well as on GameTrailers.com and the websites of Spike, Comedy Central, MTV, MTV2, and BET. As with previous years, the show featured exclusive world premieres of game demos and trailers. The 2013 VGX premieres included Telltale Games' and Gearbox Software's collaboration Tales from the Borderlands, Tomb Raider: Definitive Edition (an Xbox One and PlayStation 4 port with graphical updates and all DLC included), Remedy Entertainment's Agents of Storm for iOS, Telltale Games' Game of Thrones, and independent developer Hello Games' No Man's Sky. The 2013 show also featured reveals of Titanfall, Thief, Quantum Break, South Park: The Stick of Truth, Broken Age, Dying Light, Tom Clancy's The Division, and The Witcher 3: Wild Hunt. Nintendo of America president Reggie Fils-Aime demoed an upcoming Wii U game, Donkey Kong Country: Tropical Freeze, and Rockstar Games worked with the production team to produce a musical performance of the music of Grand Theft Auto V.

Spike Video Game awards

2012 awards
The 2012 VGAs (promoted as VGA 10 for the tenth anniversary) was held on December 7, 2012, at Sony Pictures Studios in Culver City, California. Samuel L. Jackson returned to host for a fourth time. This was the last year under the name "Spike Video Game Awards". For the first time, the awards were broadcast on Xbox Live. Live users could "play" the show as it aired live. Responses to poll questions were tabulated in real time on screen for the Xbox Live audience and users with Xbox SmartGlass devices got a unique second-screen experience that updated in real time alongside the show content. Additionally, Spike TV and Entertainment Weekly partnered to create the first-ever "Entertainment Weekly and Spike VGA Best Game of the Decade" award. Exclusive world premieres that debuted at VGA 10 include Naughty Dog's The Last of Us, Epic Games' Gears of War: Judgment, Obsidian Entertainment's South Park: The Stick of Truth, Konami's Castlevania: Lords of Shadow 2, Irrational Games' BioShock Infinite, Crystal Dynamics' Tomb Raider, Ubisoft's Assassin's Creed III: The Tyranny of King Washington, and 343 Industries' Halo 4: Spartan Ops. Two new games were announced, including Dark Souls II by  FromSoftware, and a new game called The Phantom Pain (later revealed to be Metal Gear Solid V: The Phantom Pain). The event also had appearances from all past hosts of the VGAs except David Spade. The event featured musical performances by Linkin Park, Tenacious D, Gustavo Santaolalla and Wolfgang Gartner.

2011 awards
The 2011 VGAs was held Saturday, December 10, 2011, at the Sony Pictures Studios in Culver City, California, hosted by Zachary Levi. The awards previewed world premieres of Tom Clancy's Rainbow Six: Patriots, Transformers: Fall of Cybertron, BioShock Infinite, Alan Wake's American Nightmare, Metal Gear Rising: Revengeance, Tony Hawk's Pro Skater HD, The Amazing Spider-Man, the exclusive PlayStation 3 game The Last of Us developed by Naughty Dog, Command & Conquer: Generals 2 from BioWare Victory, and Fortnite from Epic Games. New trailers for both Hitman: Absolution and Mass Effect 3 were aired during the show, as well as a pre-show announcement for Tekken Tag Tournament 2. Mark Burnett was the Executive Producer for the event, and for the first time, the VGAs aired live on MTV 2 (US), Spike.com (US) and Ginx TV (UK), in addition to Spike TV. The winners, as well as world premiere trailers, were announced during a pre-show red carpet live event hosted by GTTV's Amanda MacKay and Daniel Kayser. The 2011 VGAs also honored The Legend of Zelda franchise with its first ever "Video Game Hall of Fame Award". Another unique award at the 2011 VGAs was the NFL Blitz Cover Athlete award. This award, determined by live online voting during the event (just like Character of the Year), determined which NFL athlete would be on the cover of the EA Sports game, NFL Blitz. Appearances were by Charlie Sheen, Brooklyn Decker, Seth Green, Felicia Day, LL Cool J, Jason Biggs, Seann William Scott, Tony Hawk, will.i.am, Hulk Hogan, Stacy Keibler, Bellator MMA stars Eddie Alvarez and Michael Chandler, Blake Anderson, Adam Devine, Anders Holm, and game designers Cliff Bleszinski of Epic Games and Hideo Kojima of Konami. Musical performances were by The Black Keys and Deadmau5.

2010 awards
The 2010 VGAs was held Saturday, December 11, 2010, in Los Angeles, California at the L.A. Convention Center and returned to using a host which was Neil Patrick Harris. Unlike previous years, all the awards were not awarded during the show. Several new games were announced which include BioWare's announcement of Mass Effect 3, Prototype 2, Insane from acclaimed movie director Guillermo del Toro, The Elder Scrolls V: Skyrim, Mortal Kombat featuring Kratos, Resistance 3, Portal 2, SSX: Deadly Descents, and Forza Motorsport 4. Batman: Arkham City had another CGI trailer debut and the first trailer of Uncharted 3: Drake's Deception aired during the awards. Appearances included AnnaLynne McCord, Thor: God of Thunder video game star Chris Hemsworth, Dane Cook, Olivia Munn, Dominic Monaghan, Michael Chiklis, Academy Award nominated film director Guillermo del Toro, Halo: Reach star and VGA nominee Nathan Fillion, Nick Swardson, Tony Hawk, and the cast from the hit series It's Always Sunny In Philadelphia, Danny DeVito, Charlie Day, Glenn Howerton, Kaitlin Olson, and Rob McElhenney. Musical performances included award-winning violinist Diana Yukawa, My Chemical Romance, and José González. The show featured use of ground breaking augmented reality technology, conceived by Done and Dusted; with Lee Lodge, in partnership with Weider Design, Full Mental Jacket, and Orad.

2009 awards
The 2009 VGAs was held on December 12, 2009, at the Nokia Event Deck in Los Angeles, California and is the only VGAs that did not feature a host. It opened with a trailer announcing the sequel to Batman: Arkham Asylum. There were other exclusive looks at Prince of Persia: The Forgotten Sands, UFC 2010 Undisputed, Halo: Reach, Tron: Evolution, Medal of Honor, Crackdown 2, Bonanza, Spec Ops: The Line, Rock Band 3, Deadliest Warrior: The Game, and True Crime. Samuel L. Jackson previewed LucasArts newest upcoming Star Wars game, Star Wars: The Force Unleashed II. In addition, Green Day: Rock Band was announced and accompanied with a trailer. Appearances were made by Stevie Wonder, the cast of MTV's Jersey Shore, Green Day, and Jack Black, with live music performances by Snoop Dogg and The Bravery.

2008 awards
The 2008 VGAs was held on December 14, 2008, at Sony Pictures Studios in Culver City. Hosted by Jack Black, the show featured previews of Brütal Legend, Dante's Inferno, Fight Night Round 4, Gears of War 2 "Combustion" map pack announcement and trailer, God of War III, Grand Theft Auto IV: The Lost and Damned, Mafia II, Pearl Jam's album Ten for Rock Band, Terminator Salvation, Uncharted 2: Among Thieves, and Watchmen: The End Is Nigh. Musical performances included 50 Cent, The All-American Rejects, Weezer, and LL Cool J.

2007 awards
The 2007 VGAs aired December 9, 2007. Hosted by Samuel L. Jackson, the winners were announced ahead of the event which was held at the Mandalay Bay Events Center in Las Vegas. The show featured performances by Foo Fighters, Kid Rock, and exclusive world video game premieres of Borderlands, Gran Turismo 5 Prologue, Tom Clancy's Rainbow Six: Vegas 2, and TNA iMPACT!.

2006 awards
The 2006 VGAs aired December 13, 2006, at the Galen Center in Los Angeles and were hosted by Samuel L. Jackson. The show featured a world premiere of Blizzard Entertainment's opening cinematic movie for its highly anticipated expansion set, World of Warcraft: The Burning Crusade. The event featured musical performances by Tenacious D and AFI and show appearances by 50 Cent, Eva Mendes, Sarah Silverman, Seth Green, Masi Oka, Hayden Panettiere, Yellowcard, Brandon Routh, Rachael Leigh Cook, Tony Hawk, Michael Irvin, Method Man, Maria Menounos, Tyrese Gibson, Xzibit, James Gandolfini, Kurt Angle, among others. In character as Stewie Griffin and Tom Tucker from Family Guy, Seth MacFarlane served as the voice of the VGAs.

2005 awards
The 2005 VGAs was held December 10, 2005, at the Gibson Amphitheatre in Los Angeles. The first VGAs hosted by Samuel L. Jackson, the show featured world premieres of 24: The Game from 2K Games, Spy Hunter: Nowhere to Run from Midway Games, Star Wars: Empire at War from LucasArts, and Scarface: The World Is Yours, as well as a 25th anniversary comic tribute to Pac-Man from Namco. Musical performances were by 50 Cent, Def Leppard, and Missy Elliott, and show appearances by Charlize Theron, Kiefer Sutherland, Jack Black, Red Hot Chili Peppers, The Rock, Vin Diesel, Carson Daly, Donald Faison, Jaime Pressly, Josie Maran, Snoop Dogg, Xzibit, Carmen Electra, Natasha Bedingfield, and Dane Cook, among others.

2004 awards
The 2004 VGAs was held in Santa Monica, California on December 14, 2004, at the Barker Hangar and hosted by Snoop Dogg. The show featured exclusive world premiere game play and footage of Midway Games' Fear & Respect, The Godfather: The Game from John Singleton and Electronic Arts, and Need for Speed: Underground Rivals for the PlayStation Portable. Musical performances included Sum 41, Ludacris, and a special live performance by Snoop Dogg and the remaining members of The Doors performing "Riders on the Storm". Other performances included Snoop Dogg and Pharrell, Mötley Crüe, Busta Rhymes, and Method Man and Redman in the first-ever Def Jam: Fight For NY performance. Celebrity appearances included Brooke Burke, Samuel L. Jackson, Vin Diesel, Green Day, Giovanni Ribisi, Gabrielle Union, Tara Reid, Papa Roach, Tony Hawk, John Singleton, Danny Masterson, Frankie Muniz, Bai Ling, Ron Perlman, Bam Margera, Freddy Adu, Fabolous, Bobby Crosby, Barry Zito, and Michelle Rodriguez, among others.

2003 awards
The 2003 Spike Video Game Awards was the first video game award show to be hosted by Spike TV. It was held at the MGM Grand Garden Arena in Las Vegas, Nevada on December 2, 2003, and aired on December 4. The event was hosted by David Spade and featured appearances by Lil' Kim, Jaime Pressly, DMX, P.O.D., Orlando Jones, and Cedric the Entertainer. The event also featured a WWE tag team wrestling match with the superstars Rey Mysterio, Chris Jericho, Trish Stratus, and Victoria.

Spike's Video Game Hall of Fame
Spike's Video Game Hall of Fame was established to recognize video game "franchises throughout history that have brought the industry to where it is today" – Casey Patterson, executive producer of the VGAs and executive vice president of event production for Viacom Media Networks Entertainment Group. The only inductee, due to the award show ending in 2013, was awarded at the ninth annual Spike Video Game Awards on December 10, 2011. The inaugural, and subsequently only, recipient was The Legend of Zelda franchise. Shigeru Miyamoto accepted the award.

Nomination
With the exception of the fan-voted "Most Anticipated Game", "Character of the Year", and a few other non-annual categories, the award nominees and winners are voted by an advisory council, featuring over 20 journalists from various media outlets. Fans, however, can vote online for which games they think should win each category.

Reception
Video game journalism veteran Jeff Green has been vocal in his criticism of the Spike Video Game Awards. In his assessment of the 2010 VGAs, Green laments that Spike TV alienated viewers due to their decision to focus the awards on its own primary demographic, rather than the video game community at large. Green states that this leads to appearances by celebrities who "either didn't want to be or know why they were there." 2011 VGA host Zachary Levi recognized this and prior to hosting the event, told MTV in an interview that, "I’m happy to work on the VGAs on Spike and make the network happy, but I want to be respectful to the community of gamers because I am one myself. And [with] the humor involved, I want it to be smart, I want it to be honest, and accurate." Giant Bomb's Alex Navarro has also commented on the VGAs, questioning the importance of the awards themselves next to the VGA's focus on its exclusive reveals.

The 2011 VGAs were given similar criticisms. Kotaku reported that VGA nominees Mark Hamill and Tara Strong were disappointed that they were present at the event but their respective categories were not present at the show, only finding out the results of the "Best Performance by a Human Male" and "Best Performance by a Human Female" awards after the show. Wired.com writer Jason Schreier addressed Spike TV after the event in reference to food eating segments by Felicia Day and the host Zachary Levi having simulations of a sexual act performed on him. Schreier said, "It’s not hard to find the root of the problem here: You think we’re dumb. You think your audience is so stupid that they’ll be amused by YouTube rants and health potion gags. You think we get our jollies out of watching girls bite cupcakes off conveyor belts. You think video game references make a good substitute for humor." Schreier also quoted Joystiq's Justin McElroy, who voiced his concern at many awards being shown together in a short montage. Praise was given for the handling of The Legend of Zelda's induction into the Hall of Fame including the video package of the franchise's releases and an appearance by creator Shigeru Miyamoto.

The 2013 VGX received considerable negative press after airing; much of the criticism was aimed at host McHale's insults towards the developers and the audience.

Parodies
 The Video MADtv, highlighting the fictional 1st Annual Video Game Awards on June 21, 1977, hosted by Joe Namath (played by Michael McDonald) and Farrah Fawcett (played by Arden Myrin), musical guest The Jackson 5, and award presenter Mark Spitz (played by Ike Barinholtz). Pong and Asteroids were the only video games nominated for all of the awards presented, even though Asteroids wasn't released in the arcade until 1979. The categories shown in the sketch were "Best Graphics in a Video Game" (Asteroids wins), and "Most Realistic Sound in a Video Game" (Pong and Asteroids win in a tie). Bobby Lee accepts an award as a designer of Asteroids. Space Invaders is shown to display the future of video games, although it was released before Asteroids in 1978.

References

External links
 VGX 2013
 Every VGA Winner from Years Past

Awards established in 2003
Awards disestablished in 2014
Spike (TV network) original programming
Video game awards
Video game events
The Game Awards